Urination, also known as micturition, is the release of urine from the urinary bladder through the urethra to the outside of the body. It is the urinary system's form of excretion. It is also known medically as micturition, voiding, uresis, or, rarely, emiction, and known colloquially by various names including peeing, weeing, and pissing. In healthy humans (and many other animals), the process of urination is under voluntary control. In infants, some elderly individuals, and those with neurological injury, urination may occur as a reflex. It is normal for adult humans to urinate up to seven times during the day.

In some animals, in addition to expelling waste material, urination can mark territory or express submissiveness. Physiologically, urination involves coordination between the central, autonomic, and somatic nervous systems. Brain centres that regulate urination include the pontine micturition center, periaqueductal gray, and the cerebral cortex. In placental mammals, urine is drained through the urinary meatus, a urethral opening in the male penis or female vulval vestibule.

Anatomy and physiology

Anatomy of the bladder and outlet

The main organs involved in urination are the urinary bladder and the urethra. The smooth muscle of the bladder, known as the detrusor, is innervated by sympathetic nervous system fibers from the lumbar spinal cord and parasympathetic fibers from the sacral spinal cord. Fibers in the pelvic nerves constitute the main afferent limb of the voiding reflex; the parasympathetic fibers to the bladder that constitute the excitatory efferent limb also travel in these nerves. Part of the urethra is surrounded by the male or female external urethral sphincter, which is innervated by the somatic pudendal nerve originating in the cord, in an area termed Onuf's nucleus.

Smooth muscle bundles pass on either side of the urethra, and these fibers are sometimes called the internal urethral sphincter, although they do not encircle the urethra. Further along the urethra is a sphincter of skeletal muscle, the sphincter of the membranous urethra (external urethral sphincter). The bladder's epithelium is termed transitional epithelium which contains a superficial layer of dome-like cells and multiple layers of stratified cuboidal cells underneath when evacuated. When the bladder is fully distended the superficial cells become squamous (flat) and the stratification of the cuboidal cells is reduced in order to provide lateral stretching.

Physiology

The physiology of micturition and the physiologic basis of its disorders are subjects about which there is much confusion, especially at the supraspinal level. Micturition is fundamentally a spinobulbospinal reflex facilitated and inhibited by higher brain centers such as the pontine micturition center and, like defecation, subject to voluntary facilitation and inhibition.

In healthy individuals, the lower urinary tract has two discrete phases of activity: the storage (or guarding) phase, when urine is stored in the bladder; and the voiding phase, when urine is released through the urethra. The state of the reflex system is dependent on both a conscious signal from the brain and the firing rate of sensory fibers from the bladder and urethra. At low bladder volumes, afferent firing is low, resulting in excitation of the outlet (the sphincter and urethra), and relaxation of the bladder. At high bladder volumes, afferent firing increases, causing a conscious sensation of urinary urge. Individual  ready to urinate consciously initiates voiding, causing the bladder to contract and the outlet to relax. Voiding continues until the bladder empties completely, at which point the bladder relaxes and the outlet contracts to re-initiate storage. The muscles controlling micturition are controlled by the autonomic and somatic nervous systems. During the storage phase, the internal urethral sphincter remains tense and the detrusor muscle relaxed by sympathetic stimulation. During micturition, parasympathetic stimulation causes the detrusor muscle to contract and the internal urethral sphincter to relax. The external urethral sphincter (sphincter urethrae) is under somatic control and is consciously relaxed during micturition.

In infants, voiding occurs involuntarily (as a reflex). The ability to voluntarily inhibit micturition develops by the age of 2–3 years, as control at higher levels of the central nervous system develops.

Storage phase
During storage, bladder pressure stays low, because of the bladder's highly compliant nature. A plot of bladder (intravesical) pressure against the depressant of fluid in the bladder (called a cystometrogram), will show a very slight rise as the bladder is filled. This phenomenon is a manifestation of the law of Laplace, which states that the pressure in a spherical viscus is equal to twice the wall tension divided by the radius. In the case of the bladder, the tension increases as the organ fills, but so does the radius. Therefore, the pressure increase is slight until the organ is relatively full. The bladder's smooth muscle has some inherent contractile activity; however, when its nerve supply is intact, stretch receptors in the bladder wall initiate a reflex contraction that has a lower threshold than the inherent contractile response of the muscle.

Action potentials carried by sensory neurons from stretch receptors in the urinary bladder wall travel to the sacral segments of the spinal cord through the pelvic nerves. Since bladder wall stretch is low during the storage phase, these afferent neurons fire at low frequencies. Low-frequency afferent signals cause relaxation of the bladder by inhibiting sacral parasympathetic preganglionic neurons and exciting lumbar sympathetic preganglionic neurons. Conversely, afferent input causes contraction of the sphincter through excitation of Onuf's nucleus, and contraction of the bladder neck and urethra through excitation of the sympathetic preganglionic neurons.

Diuresis (production of urine by the kidney) occurs constantly, and as the bladder becomes full, afferent firing increases, yet the micturition reflex can be voluntarily inhibited until it is appropriate to begin voiding.

Voiding phase

Voiding begins when a voluntary signal is sent from the brain to begin urination, and continues until the bladder is empty.

Bladder afferent signals ascend the spinal cord to the periaqueductal gray, where they project both to the pontine micturition center and to the cerebrum. At a certain level of afferent activity, the conscious urge to void or urination urgency,  becomes difficult to ignore. Once the voluntary signal to begin voiding has been issued, neurons in pontine micturition center fire maximally, causing excitation of sacral preganglionic neurons. The firing of these neurons causes the wall of the bladder to contract; as a result, a sudden, sharp rise in intravesical pressure occurs. The pontine micturition center also causes inhibition of Onuf's nucleus, resulting in relaxation of the external urinary sphincter. When the external urinary sphincter is relaxed urine is released from the urinary bladder when the pressure there is great enough to force urine to flow out of the urethra. The micturition reflex normally produces a series of contractions of the urinary bladder.

The flow of urine through the urethra has an overall excitatory role in micturition, which helps sustain voiding until the bladder is empty.

Many men, and some women, may sometimes briefly shiver after or during urination.

After urination, the female urethra empties partially by gravity, with assistance from muscles. Urine remaining in the male urethra is expelled by several contractions of the bulbospongiosus muscle, and, by some men, manual squeezing along the length of the penis to expel the rest of the urine.

For land mammals over 1 kilogram, the duration of urination does not vary with body mass, being dispersed around an average of 21 seconds (standard deviation 13 seconds), despite a 4 order of magnitude (1000×) difference in bladder volume. This is due to increased urethra length of large animals, which amplifies gravitational force (hence flow rate), and increased urethra width, which increases flow rate. For smaller mammals a different phenomenon occurs, where urine is discharged as droplets, and urination in smaller mammals, such as mice and rats, can occur in less than a second. The posited benefits of faster voiding are decreased risk of predation (while voiding) and decreased risk of urinary tract infection.

Voluntary control
The mechanism by which voluntary urination is initiated remains unsettled. One possibility is that the voluntary relaxation of the muscles of the pelvic floor causes a sufficient downward tug on the detrusor muscle to initiate its contraction. Another possibility is the excitation or disinhibition of neurons in the pontine micturition center, which causes concurrent contraction of the bladder and relaxation of the sphincter.

There is an inhibitory area for micturition in the midbrain. After transection of the brain stem just above the pons, the threshold is lowered and less bladder filling is required to trigger it, whereas after transection at the top of the midbrain, the threshold for the reflex is essentially normal. There is another facilitatory area in the posterior hypothalamus. In humans with lesions in the superior frontal gyrus, the desire to urinate is reduced and there is also difficulty in stopping micturition once it has commenced. However, stimulation experiments in animals indicate that other cortical areas also affect the process.

The bladder can be made to contract by voluntary facilitation of the spinal voiding reflex when it contains only a few milliliters of urine. Voluntary contraction of the abdominal muscles aids the expulsion of urine by increasing the pressure applied to the urinary bladder wall, but voiding can be initiated without straining even when the bladder is nearly empty.

Voiding can also be consciously interrupted once it has begun, through a contraction of the perineal muscles. The external sphincter can be contracted voluntarily, which will prevent urine from passing down the urethra.

Experience of urination
The need to urinate is experienced as an uncomfortable, full feeling. It is highly correlated with the fullness of the bladder. In many males the feeling of the need to urinate can be sensed at the base of the penis as well as the bladder, even though the neural activity associated with a full bladder comes from the bladder itself, and can be felt there as well. In females the need to urinate is felt in the lower abdomen region when the bladder is full. When the bladder becomes too full, the sphincter muscles will involuntarily relax, allowing urine to pass from the bladder. Release of urine is experienced as a lessening of the discomfort.

Disorders

Clinical conditions
Many clinical conditions can cause disturbances to normal urination, including:

 Urinary incontinence, the inability to hold urine
 Stress incontinence, incontinence as a result of external mechanical disturbances
 Urge incontinence, incontinence that occurs as a result of the uncontrollable urge to urinate
 Mixed incontinence, a combination of the two types of incontinence
 Urinary retention, the inability to initiate urination
 Overactive bladder, a strong urge to urinate, usually accompanied by detrusor overactivity
 Interstitial cystitis, a condition characterized by urinary frequency, urgency, and pain
 Prostatitis, an inflammation of the prostate gland that can cause urinary frequency, urgency, and pain
 Benign prostatic hyperplasia, an enlargement of the prostate that can cause urinary frequency, urgency, retention, and the dribbling of urine
 Urinary tract infection, which can cause urinary frequency and dysuria
 Polyuria, abnormally large production of urine, associated with, in particular, diabetes mellitus (types 1 and 2), and diabetes insipidus
 Oliguria, low urine output, usually due to a problem with the upper urinary tract
 Anuria refers to absent or almost absent urine output.
 Micturition syncope, a vasovagal response which may cause fainting.
 Paruresis, the inability to urinate in the presence of others, such as in a public toilet.
 Bladder sphincter dyssynergia, a discoordination between the bladder and external urethral sphincter as a result of brain or spinal cord injury
A drug that increases urination is called a diuretic, whereas antidiuretics decrease the production of urine by the kidneys.

Experimentally induced disorders

There are three major types of bladder dysfunction due to neural lesions: (1) the type due to interruption of the afferent nerves from the bladder; (2) the type due to interruption of both afferent and efferent nerves; and (3) the type due to interruption of facilitatory and inhibitory pathways descending from the brain. In all three types the bladder contracts, but the contractions are generally not sufficient to empty the viscus completely, and residual urine is left in the bladder. Paruresis, also known as shy bladder syndrome, is an example of a bladder interruption from the brain that often causes total interruption until the person has left a public area. These people (males) may have difficulty urinating in the presence of others and will consequently avoid using urinals without dividers or those directly adjacent to another person. Alternatively, they may opt for the privacy of a stall or simply avoid public toilets altogether.

Deafferentation
When the sacral dorsal roots are cut in experimental animals or interrupted by diseases of the dorsal roots such as tabes dorsalis in humans, all reflex contractions of the bladder are abolished. The bladder becomes distended, thin-walled, and hypotonic, but there are some contractions because of the intrinsic response of the smooth muscle to stretch.

Denervation
When the afferent and efferent nerves are both destroyed, as they may be by tumors of the cauda equina or filum terminale, the bladder is flaccid and distended for a while. Gradually, however, the muscle of the "decentralized bladder" becomes active, with many contraction waves that expel dribbles of urine out of the urethra. The bladder becomes shrunken and the bladder wall hypertrophied. The reason for the difference between the small, hypertrophic bladder seen in this condition and the distended, hypotonic bladder seen when only the afferent nerves are interrupted is not known. The hyperactive state in the former condition suggests the development of denervation hypersensitization even though the neurons interrupted are preganglionic rather than postganglionic.

Spinal cord injury
During spinal shock, the bladder is flaccid and unresponsive. It becomes overfilled, and urine dribbles through the sphincters (overflow incontinence). After spinal shock has passed, a spinally mediated voiding reflex ensues, although there is no voluntary control and no inhibition or facilitation from higher centers. Some paraplegic patients train themselves to initiate voiding by pinching or stroking their thighs, provoking a mild mass reflex. In some instances, the voiding reflex becomes hyperactive. Bladder capacity is reduced and the wall becomes hypertrophied. This type of bladder is sometimes called the spastic neurogenic bladder. The reflex hyperactivity is made worse, and may be caused, by infection in the bladder wall.

Techniques

Due to the positions where the urethra exits the body, males and females often use different techniques for urination.

Male urination

Most males prefer to urinate standing while others prefer to urinate sitting or squatting. Elderly males with prostate gland enlargement may benefit from sitting down while in healthy males, no difference is found in the ability to urinate. For practising Muslim men, the genital modesty of squatting is also associated with proper cleanliness requirements or awrah.

Female urination

In human females, the urethra opens straight into the vulva. Hence, urination can take place while sitting or squatting for defecation. It is also possible for females to urinate while standing, and while clothed. It is common for women in various regions of Africa to use this method when they urinate, as do women in Laos. Herodotus described a similar custom in ancient Egypt. An alternative method for women to urinate standing is to use a tool known as a female urination device to assist.

Young children

A common technique used in many developing nations involves holding the child by the backs of the thighs, above the ground, facing outward, in order to urinate.

Fetal urination

The fetus urinates hourly and produces most of the amniotic fluid in the second and third trimester of pregnancy. The amniotic fluid is then recycled by fetal swallowing.

Urination after injury
Occasionally, if a male's penis is damaged or removed, or a female's genitals/urinary tract is damaged, other urination techniques must be used. Most often in such cases, doctors will reposition the urethra to a location where urination can still be accomplished, usually in a position that would promote urination only while seated/squatting, though a permanent urinary catheter may be used in rare cases.

Alternative urination tools

Sometimes urination is done in a container such as a bottle, urinal, bedpan, or chamber pot (also known as a gazunder). A container or wearable urine collection device may be used so that the urine can be examined for medical reasons or for a drug test, for a bedridden patient, when no toilet is available, or there is no other possibility to dispose of the urine immediately.

An alternative solution (for traveling, stakeouts, etc.) is a special disposable bag containing absorbent material that solidifies the urine within seconds, making it convenient and safe to store and dispose of later.

It is possible for both sexes to urinate into bottles in case of emergencies. The technique can help children to urinate discreetly inside cars and in other places without being seen by others. A female urination device can assist women in girls in urinating while standing or into a bottle.

Social and cultural aspects

Art

A puer mingens is a figure in a work of art depicted as a prepubescent boy in the act of urinating, either actual or simulated. The puer mingens could represent anything from whimsy and boyish innocence to erotic symbols of virility and masculine bravado.

Toilet training

Babies have little socialized control over urination within traditions or families that do not practice elimination communication and instead use diapers. Toilet training is the process of learning to restrict urination to socially approved times and situations. Consequently, young children sometimes develop nocturnal enuresis.

Facilities

It is socially more accepted and more environmentally hygienic for those who are able, especially when indoors and in outdoor urban or suburban areas, to urinate in a toilet. Public toilets may have urinals, usually for males, although female urinals exist, designed to be used in various ways.

Urination without facilities

Acceptability of outdoor urination in a public place other than at a public urinal varies with the situation and with customs. Potential disadvantages include a dislike of the smell of urine, and some exposure of genitals. The latter can be unpleasant for the one who exposes them (modesty, lack of privacy) and/or those who can see them; it can be avoided or mitigated by going to a quiet place and/or facing a tree or wall if urinating standing up, or while squatting, hiding the back behind walls, bushes, or a tree.

Portable toilets (port-a-potties) are frequently placed in outdoor situations where no immediate facility is available. These need to be serviced (cleaned out) on a regular basis. Urination in a heavily wooded area is generally harmless, actually saves water, and may be condoned for males (and less commonly, females) in certain situations as long as common sense is used. Examples (depending on circumstances) include activities such as camping, hiking, delivery driving, cross country running, rural fishing, amateur baseball, golf, etc.

The more developed and crowded a place is, the more public urination tends to be objectionable. In the countryside, it is more acceptable than in a street in a town, where it may be a common transgression. Often this is done after the consumption of alcoholic beverages, which causes production of additional urine as well as a reduction of inhibitions. One proposed way to inhibit public urination due to drunkenness is the Urilift, which is disguised as a normal manhole by day but raises out of the ground at night to provide a public restroom for bar-goers.

In many places, public urination is punishable by fines, though attitudes vary widely by country. In general, females are less likely to urinate in public than males. Women and girls, unlike men and boys, are restricted in where they can urinate conveniently and discreetly.

The 5th-century BC historian Herodotus, writing on the culture of the ancient Persians and highlighting the differences with those of the Greeks, noted that to urinate in the presence of others was prohibited among Persians.

There was a popular belief in the UK, that it was legal for a man to urinate in public so long as it occurred on the rear wheel of his vehicle and he had his right hand on the vehicle, but this is not true. Public urination still remains more accepted by males in the UK, although British cultural tradition itself seems to find such practices objectionable.

In Islamic toilet etiquette, it is haram to urinate while facing the Qibla, or to turn one's back to it when urinating or relieving bowels, but modesty requirements for females make it impossible for girls to relieve themselves without facilities. When toilets are unavailable, females can relieve themselves in Laos, Russia and Mongolia in emergency, but it remains less accepted for females in India even when circumstances make this a highly desirable option.

Women generally need to urinate more frequently than men, but as opposed to the common misconception, it is not due to having smaller bladders. Resisting the urge to urinate because of lack of facilities can promote urinary tract infections which can lead to more serious infections and, in rare situations, can cause renal damage in women. Female urination devices are available to help women to urinate discreetly, as well to help them urinate while standing.

Standing versus sitting or squatting

Males
In Western culture, the standing position is regarded by some as more comfortable and more masculine than the sitting or squatting option. However, in public restrooms without urinals and sometimes at home, men may be urged to use the sitting position as to diminish spattering of urine.
A systematic review meta-analysis of the effect of voiding position on the quality of urination found that in elderly males with benign prostate hyperplasia, the sitting position was superior compared with the standing. Healthy males were not influenced by voiding position.

A literature review found cultural differences in socially accepted voiding positions around the world and found differences in preferred position: in the Middle-East and Asia, the squatting position was more prevalent, while in the Western world the standing and sitting positions were more common.

Females

Females usually sit or squat for urination, depending on what type of toilet they use: A squat toilet is used for urination in a squatting position. If there is no toilet available then a squatting or a half squat position is common. A partial squatting position (or "hovering") is taken up during urination by some women to avoid sitting on a potentially contaminated toilet seat or when using a female urinal. However, this may leave urine behind in the bladder. It can also result in urine landing on the toilet seat.

Talking about urination

In many societies and in many social classes, even mentioning the need to urinate is seen as a social transgression, despite it being a universal need. Even today, many adults avoid stating that they need to urinate.

Many expressions exist, some euphemistic and some vulgar. For example, centuries ago the standard English word (both noun and verb, for the product and the activity) was "piss", but subsequently "pee", formerly associated with children, has become more common in general public speech. Since elimination of bodily wastes is, of necessity, a subject talked about with toddlers during toilet training, other expressions considered suitable for use by and with children exist, and some continue to be used by adults, e.g. "weeing", "doing/having a wee-wee", "to tinkle", "go potty".

Other expressions include "squirting" and "taking a leak", and, predominantly by younger persons for outdoor female urination, "popping a squat", referring to the position many women adopt in such circumstances. National varieties of English show creativity. American English uses "to whiz". Australian English has coined "I am off to take a Chinese singing lesson", derived from the tinkling sound of urination against the China porcelain of a toilet bowl. British English uses "going to see my aunt", "going to see a man about a dog", "to piddle", "to splash (one's) boots", as well as "to have a slash", which originates from the Scottish term for a large splash of liquid. One of the most common, albeit old-fashioned, euphemisms in British English is "to spend a penny", a reference to coin-operated pay toilets, which used (pre-decimalisation) to charge that sum.

Use in language

References to urination are commonly used in slang. Usage in English includes:
Piss (someone) off (to anger someone; alternatively, to leave somewhere in a hurry)
Piss off! (to express contempt; see above)
Pissing down (to refer to heavy rain)
Pissing contest (an unproductive ego-driven battle)
Pisshead (vulgar way to refer to someone who drinks too much alcohol)
Piss ant (a worthless person; in non-slang usage the term refers to several species of ant whose colonies have a urine-like odor)
Pissing up a flagpole (to partake in a futile activity)
Pissing into the wind (to act in ways that cause self-harm)
Piss away (to squander or use wastefully)
Taking the piss (to take liberties, be unreasonable, or to mock another person)
Full of piss and vinegar (energetic or ambitious late adolescent or young adult male)
Piss up (British expression for drinking to get drunk)
 Pissed (drunk in British English or angry in American English)

Urination and sexual activity
Urolagnia, a paraphilia, is an inclination to obtain sexual enjoyment by looking at or thinking of urine or urination. Urine may be consumed, or the person may bathe in it. Drinking urine is known as urophagia, though uraphagia refers to the consumption of urine regardless of whether the context is sexual. Involuntary urination during sexual intercourse is common, but rarely acknowledged. In one survey, 24% of women reported involuntary urination during sexual intercourse; in 66% of patients urination occurred on penetration, while in 33% urine leakage was restricted to orgasm.
Female kob may exhibit urolagnia during sex; one female will urinate while the other sticks her nose in the stream.

A male Patagonian mara, a type of rodent, will stand on his hind legs and urinate on a female's rump, to which the female may respond by spraying a jet of urine backwards into the face of the male. The male's urination is meant to repel other males from his partner while the female's urination is a rejection of any approaching male when she is not receptive. Both anal digging and urination are more frequent during the breeding season and are more commonly done by males.

A male porcupine urinates on a female porcupine prior to mating, spraying the urine at high velocity.

Electric shock injuries and deaths 

In 2010 in Washington state a person who had died had received burns injuries on their body that were related to receiving an electric shock.  It is thought that an electrical current had traveled through their stream of urine and into their body.  It is thought that the person had urinated into a roadside ditch and a live wire that was lying in the ditch gave the person an electric shock.

In 2014 in Spain a person died when they were urinating on a lamp post and they received an electric shock. It was reported that it is thought possible the person received the electric shock when an electric current traveled through the stream of urine and into the person's body.

Other species

While the primary purpose of urination is the same across the animal kingdom, urination often serves a social purpose beyond the expulsion of waste material. In dogs and other animals, urination can mark territory or express submissiveness. In small rodents such as rats and mice, it marks familiar paths.

The urine of animals of differing physiology or sex sometimes has different characteristics. For example, the urine of birds and reptiles is whitish, consisting of a pastelike suspension of uric acid crystals, and discharged with the feces of the animal via the cloaca, whereas mammals' urine is a yellowish colour, with mostly urea instead of uric acid, and is discharged via the urethra, separately from the feces. Some animals' (example: carnivores') urine possesses a strong odour, especially when it is used to mark territory or 

Stallions sometimes exhibit the Flehmen response by smelling the urine of a mare in heat. A stallion sometimes scent marks his urination spots to make his position as herd stallion clear. A male horse's penis is protected by a sheath when it is not in use for urination.

Ring-tailed lemurs have also been shown to mark using urine. Behaviorally, there is a difference between regular urination, where the tail is slightly raised and a stream of urine is produced, and marking behavior, where the tail is held up in display and only a few drops are used. The urine-marking behavior is typically used by females to mark territory, and has been observed primarily at the edges of the troop's territory and in areas where other troops may frequent. The urine marking behavior is also most frequent during the mating season, and may play a role in reproductive communication between groups. Many loris species also use urine for scent-marking. The white-headed capuchin sometimes engages in a practice known as "urine washing", in which the monkey rubs urine on its feet. Urine washing, in which urine is rubbed on the hands and feet, is also used by the Panamanian night monkey. In some cases, strepsirrhines may also anoint themselves with urine.

Hyenas do not raise their legs as canids do when urinating, as urination serves no territorial function for them. Instead, hyenas mark their territories using their anal glands, a trait found also in viverrids and mustelids, but not canids and felids. Unlike other female mammals, female spotted hyenas urinate, copulate, and give birth through an organ called the pseudo-penis.

Young cattle can be toilet-trained to urinate in a "latrine" where their urine can be collected for wastewater treatment, which could be used to reduce greenhouse gas emissions from the animals' urine in countries such as the Netherlands, the United States, and New Zealand.

Dog-like mammals (Canidae)

All canids (with the possible exception of dholes) use urine (combined with preputial gland secretions) to mark their territories. Many species of canids, including hoary foxes, cape foxes, and golden jackals, use a raised-leg posture when urinating. The scent of their urine is usually strongest in the winter, before the mating season.

Domestic dogs mark their territories by urinating on vertical surfaces (usually at nose level), sometimes marking over the urine of other dogs. When one dog marks over another dog's urine, this is known as "counter-marking" or "overmarking". Male dogs urine-mark more frequently than female dogs, typically beginning after the onset of sexual maturity. Male dogs, as well as wolves, sometimes lift a leg and attempt to urinate even when their bladders are empty – this is known as a "raised-leg display", "shadow-urination", or "pseudo-urination". They typically mark their territory due to the presence of new stimuli or social triggers in a dog's environment, as well as out of anxiety. Marking behavior is present in both male and female dogs, and is especially pronounced in male dogs that have not been neutered.

Raised-leg urination is the most significant form of scent marking in wolves, and is most frequent around the breeding season. Wolves urine-mark more frequently when they detect the scent of other wolves, or other canid species. Leg-lifting is more common in male wolves than female wolves, although dominant females also use the raised-leg posture. Other types of urine-marking in wolves are FLU (flexed-leg urination), STU (standing urination), and SQU (squatting urination). Breeding pairs of wolves will sometimes urinate on the same spot: this is known as "double-marking". Double-marking is practiced by both coyotes and wolves., and also by foxes.

Coyotes mark their territories by urinating on bushes, trees, or rocks. Male coyotes usually lift their legs when scent-marking. However, females sometimes also raise their legs, and males sometimes squat. Urine marking is also associated with pair bonding in coyotes Coyotes sometimes urinate on their food, possibly to claim ownership over it.

Red foxes use their urine to mark their territories. A male fox raises one hind leg and his urine is sprayed forward in front of him, whereas a female fox squats down so that the urine is sprayed in the ground between the hind legs. Urine is also used to mark empty cache sites, as reminders not to waste time investigating them. Red foxes use  to urinate, depending on where they are leaving a scent mark.

As in most other canids, male bush dogs lift their hind legs when urinating. However, female bush dogs use a kind of handstand posture, which is less common in other canids. When male bush dogs urinate, they create a spray instead of a stream.

Both male and female maned wolves use their urine to communicate, e.g. mark their hunting paths or places where they have buried hunted prey. The urine has a very distinctive smell, which some people liken to hops or cannabis. The responsible substance is very likely a pyrazine, which occurs in both plants. (At the Rotterdam Zoo, this smell once set the police on a hunt for cannabis smokers.)

Cats (Felidae)

Within the Felidae, males can urinate backwards by curving the tip of the glans penis backward. Urine marking by felids is also known as "spray-urinating" or "spray-marking". To identify their territories, male tigers mark trees by spraying urine and anal gland secretions, as well as marking trails with scat. Males show a grimacing face, called the Flehmen response, when identifying a female's reproductive condition by sniffing their urine markings.

Lions use urine to mark their territories. They often scrape the ground while urinating, and the urine often flows in short spurts, instead of flowing continuously. They often urinate on vegetation, or on tree trunks at least one meter high. Male lions spray 1–20 jets of urine at an angle of 20–30 degrees upward, at a range of up to 4 meters behind them.

Male cheetahs mark their territory by urinating on objects that stand out, such as trees, logs, or termite mounds. The whole coalition contributes to the scent. Males will attempt to kill any intruders, and fights result in serious injury or death. When male cheetahs urine-mark their territories, they stand a meter away from a tree or rock surface with the tail raised, pointing the penis either horizontally backward or 60° upward. The odor of cheetah urine (unlike that of other large felids) cannot be easily detected by humans.

Black-footed cats use scent marking throughout their ranges, with males spraying urine up to 12 times an hour.

See also
 Defecation
 Human positions
 Post micturition convulsion syndrome
 Sanitation

References

Further reading

External links

 , describes the neurophysiology of urination
 "Urination" at HowStuffWorks.com

Articles containing video clips
Excretion
Human positions
Medical signs
Partial squatting position
Urine
Urology